The Chief Justice of the Supreme Court of Gibraltar is one of the four judges who make up the supreme court of Gibraltar. Previously the Chief Justice was appointed by the Governor of Gibraltar on the advice of the British Foreign and Commonwealth Office. Under the 2006 Constitution the Governor, on the advice of the Judicial Service Commission, makes the appointment on behalf of the Monarch.

As a judge of the Supreme Court, the Chief Justice is responsible for hearing civil and criminal proceedings, including Family Jurisdiction, Court of Protection, Admiralty Jurisdiction and Ordinary (Chancery) Jurisdiction, as well as appeals from the Magistrates' Court.

History
Notable Chief Justices include Sir James Cochrane who held the post for over thirty years during the nineteenth century. Notable cases include the resolution of the strange case of the Mary Celeste, a ship found abandoned at sea in 1872.

On 17 September 2007 the Governor announced the suspension of The Hon. Chief Justice Derek Schofield on full pay pending the investigation and resolution of the ongoing conflict between him, Chief Minister Peter Caruana and leading members of the Gibraltar Bar Association stemming from the judicial reforms introduced through Gibraltar's new constitution and the Judicial Services Act. During Schofield's suspension, Additional Judge Anthony Dudley was acting Chief Justice.

On 1 February 2010, The Convent announced that acting on the advice of the Judicial Services Commission, Governor Sir Adrian Johns had on behalf of Queen Elizabeth, formally appointed Anthony Dudley as Chief Justice of Gibraltar. He is the first Gibraltarian judge to be appointed Chief Justice of Gibraltar.

List of Chief Justices

See also
Court system of Gibraltar

References

External links
Organisation of Justice in Gibraltar
Gibraltar's Constitution & Legal System

Gibraltar law